Courtney Angela Brkic (born 1972) is a Croatian American memoirist, short story writer, and academic.

Early life
Brkic is a native of Washington, D.C. who grew up in Arlington, Virginia and graduated from Yorktown High School.  She graduated from the College of William and Mary with a major in anthropology and a minor in Hispanic Studies.  Before earning her MFA from New York University, Brkic lived in Bosnia, Croatia, and the Netherlands.

Career
In 1996, at the age of 23, she went to eastern Bosnia and Herzegovina as part of a Physicians for Human Rights forensic team.  She spent a month helping to exhume and identify the bodies of thousands of men and boys who were massacred by Serb forces the year before.  She went on to work as a summary translator for the International Criminal Tribunal for the former Yugoslavia.

She has taught creative writing at New York University, the Cooper Union, and Kenyon College, where she held the Richard L. Thomas Chair in Creative Writing in 2006. She teaches at George Mason University, and lives in New York City with her husband, Phil.

Awards
 2008 National Endowment for the Arts Literature Grant
 2003 Whiting Award for Fiction and Nonfiction 
 Fulbright Scholarship to research women in Croatia's war-affected population
 New York Times Fellowship.

Works

Books

Translations

Short stories

Essays

References

External links
"Author's website"
"Courtney Angela Brkic: Author of Stone Fields converses with Robert Birnbaum", identity theory, May 24, 2005
"The Stone Fields by Courtney Angela Brkic", Bookslut, October 2004
Profile at The Whiting Foundation

1973 births
Living people
Writers from Washington, D.C.
American people of Croatian descent
American women short story writers
People from Arlington County, Virginia
College of William & Mary alumni
New York University alumni
New York University faculty
Kenyon College faculty
Cooper Union faculty
George Mason University faculty
American women anthropologists
American women academics
21st-century American memoirists
American women memoirists
Writers from Virginia
20th-century translators
21st-century American translators
21st-century American short story writers
21st-century American women writers
21st-century American anthropologists
Yorktown High School (Virginia) alumni